The Intelligencer may refer to the following newspapers:

The Intelligencer (Belleville), a daily newspaper published in Belleville, Ontario
The Intelligencer (Doylestown, Pennsylvania) in Doylestown, Pennsylvania
The Intelligencer, an 18th-century periodical launched by  Jonathan Swift and Thomas Sheridan in 1728
The Edwardsville Intelligencer, a daily newspaper published in Edwardsville, Illinois
Ames Tribune, originally known as The Intelligencer
Intelligencer (website), an offshoot of New York magazine
The Intelligencer and Wheeling News Register in Wheeling, West Virginia

See also
Intelligencer (disambiguation)
Intelligence (disambiguation)